The Blind Goddess is a lost 1926 American silent mystery film directed by Victor Fleming. It was produced by Famous Players-Lasky and released by Paramount Pictures. The film is based on the novel The Blind Goddess by Arthur Cheney Train.

Cast
Jack Holt as Hugh Dillon
Esther Ralston as Moira Devens
Ernest Torrence as 'Big Bill' Devens
Louise Dresser as Mrs. Eileen Clayton
Ward Crane as Tracy Redmond
Richard Tucker as Henry Kelling
Louis Payne as Taylor
Charles Clary as District Attorney
Erwin Connelly as chief of detectives
Charles Lane as Judge
Vondell Darr

References

External links

Stills at silenthollywood.com

1926 films
1920s mystery drama films
American silent feature films
Films directed by Victor Fleming
American black-and-white films
Films based on American novels
Lost American films
American mystery drama films
1926 drama films
1920s American films
Silent American drama films
Silent mystery drama films
Lost mystery drama films
1920s English-language films